Go! Princess PreCure is the twelfth anime television series in Izumi Todo and Bandai's Pretty Cure franchise, produced by Asahi Broadcasting Corporation and Toei Animation. The series aired on TV Asahi between February 1, 2015 and January 31, 2016, replacing HappinessCharge PreCure! in its initial timeslot and was succeeded by Maho Girls PreCure!.


Episode list

See also
Go! Princess Precure the Movie: Go! Go!! Splendid Triple Feature!!! - A three-part animated film feature based on the series.
Pretty Cure All Stars: Spring Carnival♪ - The seventh Pretty Cure All Stars crossover film, which stars the Princess Pretty Cures.

References

Pretty Cure episode lists